Mayo is a town in south-western Ivory Coast. It is a commune in Soubré sub-prefecture of Soubré Department, Nawa Region, Bas-Sassandra District. Since 2012, Mayo is the only commune seat that is not also the seat of a sub-prefecture.

The commune was established in April 1998.

Notes

Populated places in Bas-Sassandra District
Populated places in Nawa Region
Communes of Nawa Region